Alexis Nicolás Castro (born 23 January 1984) is an Argentine footballer who plays as a midfielder for Sarmiento Resistencia

Career

Club
Castro started his career with Instituto in 2004, he made 24 league appearances and scored one goal for the club before he left in 2007 to join UAE Arabian Gulf League side Al-Ahli. However, his spell with Al-Ahli was short as he left soon after to return to Argentina and join Huracán but after just 8 appearances in one year with Huracán, he was soon on the move again as, in 2008, he agreed to sign for Atlético Tucumán. 20 appearances and 12 months later, Castro departed Atlético Tucumán after winning the 2008–09 Primera B Nacional and joined Atlético de Rafaela. In three years with Rafaela, Castro participated in 110 matches, scored 27 goals and won the 2010–11 Primera B Nacional.

2012 saw a move firstly to Godoy Cruz and then to Newell's Old Boys. In June 2015, he was loaned out to Sarmiento. He made 14 Argentine Primera División appearances for Sarmiento before returning to Newell's Old Boys. In January 2016, Castro completed a loan move to Aldosivi and made his debut for the club on 6 February against Olimpo.

Career statistics

Club
.

Honours

Club
Atlético Tucumán
 Primera B Nacional (1): 2008–09

Atlético de Rafaela
 Primera B Nacional (1): 2010–11

References

External links
 

1984 births
Living people
Instituto footballers
Al Ahli Club (Dubai) players
Club Atlético Huracán footballers
Atlético Tucumán footballers
Atlético de Rafaela footballers
Godoy Cruz Antonio Tomba footballers
Newell's Old Boys footballers
Club Atlético Sarmiento footballers
Aldosivi footballers
Sarmiento de Resistencia footballers
Argentine Primera División players
Primera Nacional players
UAE Pro League players
Association football midfielders
Argentine footballers
Footballers from Córdoba, Argentina